Sandra Welner (1958–2001) was an American physician, inventor, and advocate for disabled women's healthcare.

Early life and education 
Sandra Leah Welner was raised in Pittsburgh, Pennsylvania, the daughter of Nikodem and Barbara Safier Welner.  Her parents were both Polish-born and British-educated; her father was a civil engineer, and her mother was a nurse. Sandra graduated from Hillel Academy in 1975, as valedictorian and a National Merit Scholar.  Welner enrolled in an accelerated medical education program, where she completed undergraduate work at Lehigh University, and earned her medical degree from the Medical College of Pennsylvania, in 1981 (at age 22).  She completed further training in her specialty, obstetrics and gynecology, at Yale University.

Career 
Welner began her career as a surgeon and an infertility specialist, directing a women's clinic in Atlanta, Georgia. In 1987, she experienced a cardiac arrest while at a hospital in the Netherlands. Complications afterwards led to neurological impairments, particularly affecting mobility, vision, and fine-motor skills. After bleak initial prognosis and five years of rehabilitation, she was eventually able to resume a career in medicine, if not as a surgeon. (She continued to use a cane and other supports.)

Welner's practice after her injury focused on primary care for disabled women. Her Washington D.C. location allowed Welner to consult with federal agencies, and with the American Cancer Society and other national organizations. She was also an assistant professor of obstetrics and gynecology at Georgetown University and University of Maryland medical schools. She authored several journal articles and contributed to two books about women's health and disability. Her handbook, Welner's Guide to the Care of Women with Disabilities was published posthumously.

Welner's work with disabled women patients led her to invent the Welner table, a universally-accessible examination table that adjusts in position and height, for easier transfers from a wheelchair. The table also serves the disabled physician, by allowing a wider range of positions for performing examinations.

Works

Journal articles

Books and chapters

Personal life 

Welner's brothers Michael Welner and Alan Welner are also physicians (Michael a forensic psychiatrist, Alan a physiatrist).
 
Sandra Welner died in 2001, in Washington DC, from extensive burns sustained in an apartment fire after a candle flame came in contact with loose clothing.  She was buried at Parkway Jewish Center Cemetery in Allegheny County, Pennsylvania.

Legacy 

The professional handbook Welner was co-editing (with Florence Haseltine) before her death, Welner's Guide to the Care of Women with Disabilities, was published by Lippincott Williams & Wilkins in 2003.

In 2004, she was inducted posthumously into the National Hall of Fame for Persons with Disabilities, in Columbus, Ohio.

The Welner table is in production and can be found in clinics worldwide, especially in her home city, at the Center for Women with Disabilities at Magee-Women's Hospital.

Welner's longtime friend, Jeffrey Lovitky, was lead attorney in a successful case, American Council of the Blind v. Paulson, brought in 2002 by the American Council of the Blind; the court's 2006 ruling requiring the United States Treasury Department to redesign paper money for blind users was upheld on appeal in 2008.  Lovitky mentioned in interviews that his memories of Welner's experiences handling money were one reason that he took the case.

References 

American disability rights activists
Women inventors
1958 births
2001 deaths
20th-century American women physicians
20th-century American physicians
20th-century American inventors